Abou El Hassan District is a district of Chlef Province, lying situated on the Mediterranean Sea, northern Algeria. The district contains the capital, Abou El Hassan, holding a total population of approximately 20,164 residents according to the 1998 census.

Communes 
The district is further divided into 3 communes:

 Abou El Hassen
 Talassa 
 Tadjena

References

Districts of Chlef Province